Tranqueras is a city in the Rivera Department of northeastern Uruguay.

Geography

History
During the first decades of the 19th century the area was known as Paso de Tranqueras because of the homonymous bridge over the Tacuarembó Grande river. In 1890 the French Marcos Bourré donated to the state some land for the construction of a railway station. The arrival of the railway became the birth point of a village which grew rapidly with hotels, stores and small industry.

On 22 July 1914 it was declared a "Pueblo" (village) by the Act of Ley Nº 5.107, and on 15 October 1963, its status was elevated to "Villa" (town) by the Act of Ley Nº 13.167. Finally, on 13 December 1994 its status was elevated to "Ciudad" (city) by the Act of Ley Nº 16.667.

Population
In 2011 Tranqueras had a population of 7,235. This makes it the second largest populated place of the department.
 
Source: Instituto Nacional de Estadística de Uruguay

Places of worship
 Sacred Heart Parish Church (Roman Catholic)

References

External links
INE map of Tranqueras
Intendencia Departamental de Rivera / Tranqueras

Populated places in the Rivera Department